Mootsinyane is a community council located in the Mohale's Hoek District of Lesotho. Its population in 2006 was 9,995.

Villages
The community of Mootsinyane includes the villages of 
 
  Anone
  Baletsi
  Bompolasi
  Borakapane
  Boritsa
  Fika-la-Tšoene
  Ha 'Mamaqabe
  Ha Beka
  Ha Khoai
  Ha Lebele
  Ha Leketa
  Ha Lekhafola
  Ha Lengau
  Ha Make
  Ha Makhalanyane
  Ha Makoae (Tlaling)
  Ha Malephane
  Ha Matoli
  Ha Mocheko
  Ha Moena (Ha Lesibo)
  Ha Moena (Ha Monyefoli)
  Ha Moena (Moreneng)
  Ha Mohapi
  Ha Mohlomi
  Ha Mokhoele
  Ha Mokoto
  Ha Molibeli
  Ha Mothiba
  Ha Nkieane
  Ha Ntee
  Ha Pholo
  Ha Pita (Mokh'opha)
  Ha Raisa
  Ha Ralikhomo
  Ha Ramokhongoana
  Ha Ramonethi
  Ha Ramothobi (Ha Lekholoa)
  Ha Ramothobi (Ha Lekhotso)
  Ha Ramothobi (Moreneng)
  Ha Raqoatha
  Ha Sebothama
  Ha Seliane
  Ha Sentšo
  Ha Sethunya
  Ha Setulo
  Ha Shalane
  Ha Thabo
  Ha Tsela (Manyareleng)
  Ha Tsela (Mokh'opha)
  Ha Tsietsi
  Khohlong
  Khokhotsaneng
  Lekhalong
  Letlapeng
  Liqaleng
  Lithipeng
  Litšoeneng
  Makilanyaneng
  Marakong
  Matlapaneng
  Matolong
  Matsakaneng
  Matsatsaneng
  Mohlakaneng
  Mohloareng
  Motse-Mocha
  Motse-Mocha (Tlaling)
  Phoseng
  Phuthing
  Qeneng
  Sebataolong
  Sekhutloaneng
  Sekoaing
  Shalane
  Taung (Tlaling)
  Thaba-Bosiu
  Tlaling (Manganeng)
  Tlaling (Thabaneng)
  Tlokoeng
  Tsekong and Tšieng

References

External links
 Google map of community villages

Populated places in Mohale's Hoek District